Jürgen Fenk (born 7 February 1966) is a German businessman and was a member of the Board of Managing Directors of Helaba Landesbank Hessen-Thüringen. He is now part of the Group Executive Board at the Signa Holding

Biography

Education
Fenk studied Economics & Organizational Psychology and received an MBA (Master of Business Administration) at Ludwig-Maximilians Universität in München, Germany. He started his professional life in 1992 as a Credit Analyst at the Bayerische Vereinsbank AG (later HypoVereinsbank).

Career

Jürgen Fenk became vice president in International Real Estate in May 1996 at the Bayerische Vereinsbank AG located in Munich. In September 1998, he became Senior Credit Officer for Central & Eastern Europe at HVB, Munich. In November 1999 he received a promotion and became a Member of the Board for Commercial Real Estate at HBV Real Estate Capital in Paris.

In June 2003, Jürgen Fenk joined the board of directors at Hypo Real Estate Bank in Dublin. In January 2007, he served as the Chairman of Hypo Real Estate Capital Corporation (a subsidiary of Hypo Real Estate Bank International). He also was chief executive officer from April 2006 to 2009 and served as Chief Risk Officer of Hypo Real Estate Bank International (Hypo International) for 2 years. He also worked as the Vice Chairman of Quadra Realty Trust Inc.

In July 2009, Fenk relocated to Frankfurt am Main and joined Helaba as a General Manager. After moving to Vienna in September 2010 where he joined BAWAG as Head of International Real Estate for 2 years, Jürgen Fenk became a Member of the Board of Managing Directors at the Helaba Landesbank Hessen-Thüringen in October 2012.
Fenk is also the Chairman of ULI Germany (Urban Land Institute). The mission of ULI ".. is to provide leadership in the responsible use of land and in creating and sustaining thriving communities worldwide."

References

1966 births
German bankers
Living people